{{Infobox Game
| subject_name= Vampire: The Eternal Struggle(previously Jyhad)
| italic title=yes
| image_link=  
| image_caption = Vampire: The Eternal Struggles library and crypt card back designs
| designer= Richard Garfield
| publisher= White Wolf Publishing
| players= 2–5
| ages= 13+
| setup_time= ~ 5 minutes
| playing_time= ~ 1–2 hours
| random_chance= Some
| skills= Strategy deck-building bluffing
}}Vampire: The Eternal Struggle (published as Jyhad in the first or "Limited" edition and often abbreviated as V:TES) is a multiplayer collectible card game published by White Wolf Publishing. It is set in the World of Darkness and is based on the Vampire: The Masquerade roleplaying game.

Publication history
The game was designed in 1994 by Richard Garfield and initially published by Wizards of the Coast and was the third CCG ever created, after Magic: The Gathering and Spellfire. As Garfield's first follow-up to his popular Magic: The Gathering collectible card game, he was eager to prove that the genre was "a form of game as potentially diverse as board games". The release consisted of 438 cards sold in 76-card starter decks and 19-card booster packs. In 1995 the game was renamed from Jyhad to Vampire: The Eternal Struggle to increase its appeal and distance itself from the Islamic term jihad.

White Wolf published The Eternal Struggle: A Strategy Guide to the Jyhad in 1995, and Wizards published a player's guide Darkness Unveiled in August 1996. After the 1996 Sabbat expansion, Wizards of the Coast abandoned the game, and in 2000 White Wolf took over development.

White Wolf announced that Vampire: The Eternal Struggle would cease production on September 10, 2010.

On April 24, 2018, Black Chantry Productions, a fan-run organization, announced the company has obtained the license to produce Vampire: The Eternal Struggle and return the game to print. They produced expansions that were made available for free as PDFs and new sets of physical cards.

Richard Garfield noted that the experiences he had made with the Magic: The Gathering collectible card game had helped him to improve his design of the game. In an interview with Robert Goudie, Garfield particularly notes dedicated multi-player (3+) rules, a lack of "land cards", and a more rapid card drawing mechanism (cards normally being replaced instantly after being played).

Setting
The game is set in the World of Darkness, drawing mainly from the Vampire: The Masquerade role-playing game. After the events of Gehenna ended the official World of Darkness storyline, V:TES is considered a sort of alternative reality of the setting, as it continues though White Wolf publishes no further official products for the roleplaying game.

In V:TES, each player takes on the role of a Methuselah, an ancient and manipulative vampire, who is not itself present in the struggle, but acts from afar. Each Methuselah will try to eliminate all others by nullifying their influence and power. To that end, the Methuselahs will control and manipulate a number of minions (mostly younger vampires) to attack and destroy the other Methuselahs' resources.

Gameplay

Overview
The game is ideally played by a group of four or five players, but it can be played by any number of players from two up. Group play with more than six players is rare, as an individual's turn can easily take two to three minutes, causing a slow game for all. Two-player games (and to some extent three-player games) also suffer from lack of opportunity for the kind of inter-player alliances and treachery that are a large part of the game.

As in most other collectible card games, each player designs his or her own deck. Each deck is built with two components:

'Crypt' - amber-backed cards representing vampires (and in some cases mortal allies) that the player may control during the game.

'Library' - green-backed cards generally representing assets or actions to be taken during the game.. Most cards in the library can only be used in conjunction with vampires once they have been brought out from the crypt.

Each player starts the game with 30 "pool", which represents the player's influence. If a player's pool is reduced to 0, the player is "ousted" and eliminated from the game. The object for each player is to oust their "prey" (the player seated on their left) while defending themself from their "predator" (the player seated on their right). Each time a player is ousted, their predator gains a victory point and 6 pool, with a bonus victory point for being the last surviving player in the game; when all but one of the players have been eliminated, the player with the most victory points wins.

On a player's turn, they direct their minions to perform a number of actions and attacks, which other players' minions may intercept or interrupt. A player must spend their own pool in order to bring vampires out from their crypt or sometimes to play cards from their hand (as indicated on the card). Therefore, players continually have to make decisions based on how much they want to invest into assets in play and how much to retain to stay alive, especially against other players capable of sudden dangerous "bleeds" (direct attacks on the player's pool).

Gameplay offers many options for alliance or betrayal. Due to the fact that being ousted nets the predator 6 pool, and thus makes him stronger and more dangerous to the next prey, it is not uncommon for players to suddenly start helping a player in a weak situation, or gang up on a player who seems to be getting too strong. This makes forming and shifting alliances part and parcel of the game. Short-term deals and trade-offs (with very fluid terms) are typical, and bluffing is also often used.

Games can take anything from half an hour to three or more hours (for a 5-player game). In tournament play and in some informal games, a time limit may be imposed, after which all remaining players receive half a victory point in addition to any they may have already received. Standard time limit for a tournament game is 2 hours. Game time varies greatly depending on the number of players and the style of decks played.

Playing styles
There are many ways to win in V:TES, though they all depend on eventually wearing down your prey's pool. Some of the most common styles, as described in official player's guide are:

 Bleed / Stealth Bleed - this deck concentrates on causing as much pool loss as possible, either as quickly as possible, or by bleeding heavily during a moment of weakness. It usually has some way of ensuring that bleeds are more likely to slip past the defenses, the classical way of which would be playing 'stealth' cards.
 Combat / Rush - this type of deck is based on attacking opponents' vampires, rendering them incapable of acting, or destroying them outright. After the defense has been whittled away, it then starts bleeding normally. It also defends itself by attacking individual vampires (mainly of its own predator) that pose a threat.
 Political - this deck is geared to take advantage of the political system built into the game. It concentrates on having as many votes (usually via powerful vampires) on the table as possible. It is then able to call and pass its own political actions, which classically include those directly damaging its own prey.
 Build - this deck attempts to survive during the early game while it builds up to later on control the table via these accumulated assets, be they vampires, large amounts of reserve pool, votes, or other cards. It is usually combined with another style.
 Intercept / Wall - This deck, often combined with the 'Combat' or the 'Build' style, tries to intercept the vampires of the prey when they act (and then likely attempts destroying them). Alternatively, it may be a defensive deck slowly building its strength for the late game, using its intercepting abilities to stop itself from being ousted in the meantime.
 Toolbox''' - this style attempts to be able to do as much as possible of all the styles above at the same time, mixing its cards. It is often a 'Build'-style deck at the same time.

All the above deck types have various weaknesses, the most glaring being that a deck should theoretically be able to do ALL the above well, to take advantage of evolving game situations, and to counter other styles it may come up against. However, if it uses this 'Toolbox' approach too strongly, it may spread itself too thin, and end up being incapable of following through.

Distinct nature
What sets V:TES apart from most other collectible card games is the strong group play element. In general a player will concentrate on the player to his immediate left, his prey, and a player who succeeds in ousting his prey receives a strong boost by gaining 6 additional pool. This boost of resources might possibly enable him to eventually "sweep the table" (gaining momentum with every kill) and oust every other player. Thus there is a tendency for players to help weaker ones to frustrate the stronger players' dominance. This ensures that most players stay in the game longer, instead of the playing field being reduced quickly to those with the best cards and the greatest skill.

These conditions create a game where players are almost always interacting with the other players for both short- and long-term goals instead of simply waiting for their turns. V:TES is a game of negotiation, skill, and deck-building. Deals and alliances, both for the moment or for the whole game, can play a big role. There is even a whole type of card called "political action" cards, which are designed with this in mind. When a player plays one, a referendum is called in which each player can cast votes, either by using votes granted from cards in play (typically from vampires with a "title" such as a Prince or Bishop) or by playing cards from hand, and the results of the referendum can affect all the players - though which players benefit and which players get hurt are all up to how the votes are cast.

Sets and expansionsWhite Wolf releases V:TES cards in base sets, expansion sets, and mini-expansion sets. The main difference between these are the size of the set and the number of reprints.
 Base sets contain booster packs as well as a number of pre-constructed starter decks (ranging from 3 to 6). The starter decks contain 89 cards (with 77 library and 12 crypt cards) as well as a rule booklet. The booster packs contain 11 cards (in newer sets, often with 7 common, 3 vampire, and 1 rare card, but refer to the table below). The base set should provide a new player with a number of cards to be able to build a wide variety of decks. A base set usually contains a high percentage of reprinted cards from earlier expansions.
 Expansion sets contain booster packs and may contain a number of pre-constructed starter decks. The distribution of cards in boosters and starters is similar to a base set. They feature also a particular theme. New players are usually not able to build a large number of different decks with only cards from this expansion's boosters due to the lack of basic cards provided either in the starters or in a base set. The number of reprints is low and usually restricted to the pre-constructed starter decks.
 Mini-Expansion sets contain only booster packs, and the number of cards are restricted to 60 new cards (20 rare, 20 uncommon, and 20 common cards).
All expansion sets from the Dark Sovereigns expansion onward are identified by an expansion symbol printed in the upper right corner of cards. In newsgroups and on web pages, character codes are used to identify each set, usually an abbreviation of the expansion's name.

Reception
In a review in issue #10 of Pyramid magazine, Scott Haring stated that while Magic: The Gathering created the collectible card game market, Vampire: The Eternal Struggle established it as a "legitimate game category". He also stated that the game had "pretty good" art, but that the numerous icons would take time to learn.Vampire: The Eternal Struggle was a very popular card game in the 1990s, outselling most other collectible card games on the market at the time, although behind Magic: The Gathering in sales. A common criticism reported from players was its slow play speed. An article in the first issue of InQuest stated that the game is "complicated and takes a while to play" but can be "fiendishly rewarding".

Steve Faragher of Arcane magazine gave the game a score of 7/10, calling it the most "intriguingly political" card game he had played, and praising its storytelling atmosphere. He appreciated the higher play speed that came with the Vampire: The Eternal Struggle re-launch's revised rules, although fellow Arcane staff member Jon Moore still found the game slow to play.

Martin Klimes reviewed the Ancient Hearts expansion for Arcane magazine, rating it an 8 out of 10 overall. Klimes comments that "There is now pretty much always a good attack you can choose, and almost always a choice of defences against it. Ancient Hearts will add significant interest to your games, which is all you can ask of any expansion."

Jennifer Clarke Wilkes reviewed the Sabbat expansion in the December 1996 issue of The Duelist, stating that as an expansion set it is "remarkably helpful" but that it "falls a little short of its goal" as a standalone set.

Awards
In 2004, Inquest Gamer Magazine picked Vampire: The Eternal Struggle as the all-time best multiplayer collectible card games. 

In 2006, Inquest Gamer Fan Awards called the Third Edition expansion the 'Best CCG Expansion'.

ReviewsRollespilsmagasinet Fønix (Danish) (Issue 5 - November/December 1994)
Review in Shadis

V:TES Online
From December 2005 to the end of 2007 an online implementation of  Vampire: The Eternal Struggle named "Vampire: The Eternal Struggle Online" was available. It was developed and maintained by CCG Workshop. Players could create decks and compete online for a monthly fee. White Wolf Publishing had allowed CCG Workshop to release the Camarilla, Anarchs, Final Nights, Legacies of Blood, Black Hand and Kindred Most Wanted sets for online play.

References

Andrew Greenberg, Richard Garfield & Daniel Greenberg, Eternal Struggle: A Player's Guide to Jyhad (White Wolf Game Studio, 1994)

Further reading

Preview of Jyhad in Scrye #4
Overview in Scrye #8
Strategy in Scrye'' #68

External links
 Black Chantry Productions (BCP) (Current Publisher of V:TES)
 Vampire: Elder Kindred Network (VEKN) (official V:TES players' organization)
 Carnet d'un Diableriste Fourtou de réflexions sur Vampire : The Eternal Struggle 

Card games introduced in 1994
Collectible card games
Vampire: The Masquerade